"Come Back" is a song by electronic dance music act, Chicane. The song is a re-work of English singer Paul Young's 1983 song "Come Back and Stay". The song was digitally released on 24 May 2010, and was later released on Chicane's fourth studio album, Giants.

Track listing

Music video
Follows an Englishman wanting to win back his girlfriend showing off some cool dance moves and makes a journey to certain places throughout Europe which shows out on a map as a love heart.

Charts

References

Chicane (musician) songs
2010 singles
2010 songs
Songs written by Jack Lee (musician)